The Nanjing–Anqing intercity railway is a high-speed rail, passenger-dedicated line between cities of Nanjing, Jiangsu Province and Anqing, Anhui Province, in China. Construction of the  railway began in January 2010, and the line was opened on 6 December 2015.

This railway is a branch of the Beijing–Shanghai high-speed railway.

The total investment is predicted to be 25.702 billion RMB, provided by the Railway departments of Jiangsu province and Anhui province.

Most of the line runs along the southern bank of the Yangtze, but Anqing is located on the northern side of the river. The Anqing Railway Bridge is being constructed  before the Anqing station. The bridge will also serve the Fuyang–Jingdezhen Railway.

Operation
The capacity is estimated to be about 125 pairs of trains each day. The railway cut travel time between Nanjing and Anqing from 8 hours to 1.5 hours. It will also allow passengers to travel between Anqing and Shanghai in 3 hours, compared to the current 12 hours. This new railway will be connected to the Yangtze River Delta region's railway network.

Trains are expected to be in service each day from 06:00 to 12:00. 60 pairs of trains will be in operation with a minimum interval between trains of 4 minutes, and an average interval of 15 minutes.

The cost to passengers will be 0.4 to 0.5 RMB (4 to 5 mao) per kilometre.

Stations
The railway serves 10 stations along its route.

See also
 High-speed rail in China
 Nanjing–Tongling Railway and Tongling–Jiujiang Railway, an older railway line along a parallel route

References

External links
 Images of construction
 Map showing stations

High-speed railway lines in China
Rail transport in Anhui
Rail transport in Jiangsu
Transport in Nanjing
2015 establishments in China
Railway lines opened in 2015
Anqing